Jhatka, or Jhataka or chatka, is the meat from an animal killed instantly, such as by a single strike of a sword or axe to sever the head within the Sikh religion. This type of slaughter is preferred by most Rajputs in Hinduism, Sikhs, as well as meat-consuming Buddhists, Hindus and some khatiks of the Punjab region and North India, also within this method of butchering the animal must not be scared or shaken before the slaughter.

Etymology
Jhatka is derived from jhatiti which means "instantly, quickly, at once".

Importance in Sikhism

Although not all Sikhs maintain the practice of eating meat butchered in this style, it is well known by most Sikhs to have been mandated by the ten Sikh Gurus:

As stated in the official Khalsa Code of Conduct as well as the Sikh Rehat Maryada, Kutha meat is forbidden, and Sikhs are recommended to eat the jhatka form of meat.

Jhatka karna or jhatkaund refers to the instant severing of the head of an animal with a single stroke of any weapon, with the underlying intention of killing the animal whilst causing it minimal suffering.

During the British Raj, the Sikhs began to assert their right to slaughter through Jhatka. When jhatka meat was not allowed in jails, and Sikhs detained for their part in the Akali movement to resort to violence and agitations to secure this right. Among the terms in the settlement between the Akalis and the Muslim Unionist government in Punjab in 1942 was that jhatka meat be continued by Sikhs.

On religious Sikh festivals, including Hola Mohalla and Vaisakhi, at the Hazur Sahib Nanded, and many other Sikh Gurdwaras, jhatka meat is offered as "mahaprasad" to all visitors in a Gurdwara. This practice is considered to be unacceptable by modern Sikh sects who believe only lacto-vegetarian langar is supposed to be served inside gurudwaras after the introduction of Colonial-era "Mahants" and "Udasis" into Sikh Gurdwaras.

Some Sikh organizations, such as the Akhand Kirtani Jatha, have their own codes of conduct regarding meat consumption. These organizations define kutha meat as any type of slaughtered meat, and eating meat of any type is forbidden aside from that which is slaughtered on religious festivals and individual "Akhand paht" three-day prayers.

Comparison with Kosher and Halal methods
Both methods use sharp knives. In the kosher and halal methods, Shechita and Dhabihah respectively, the animal is slaughtered by one swift, uninterrupted cut severing the trachea, esophagus, carotid arteries, jugular veins, and vagus nerves, followed by a period where the blood of the animal is drained out. In the Jhatka method, a swift uninterrupted cut severs the head and the spine. In both Shechita and Dhabihah, a prayer to God is required at the start of the slaughtering process. In Shechita one prayer is sufficient for the slaughter of multiple animals, so long as there is no interruption between them; in Dhabihah a separate prayer is required before each animal is slaughtered. This prayer, however, makes the meat not meeting the requirement of jhatka.

Terminology for non-jhatka products

Slaughter by means such as kosher and halal does not meet the requirements of jhatka and the products of it are referred to as kutha meat – abstention from which is one of the requirements for a Sikh to be an initiated Khalsa or sahajdhari according to the Rehat Maryada (Sikh code of conduct).

In Sikhism, there are three objections to non-jhatka or kutha products: the first being the belief that sacrificing an animal in the name of God is ritualism and something to be avoided; the second being the belief that killing an animal with a slow bleeding method is inhumane; and the third being historic opposition of the right of ruling Muslims to impose its practices on non-Muslims. However, kutha meat doesn't include just Halal or Kosher meat but any meat produced by slow bleeding or the perceived religious sacrifice of animals, including meat from animals slaughtered ritualistically in Hinduism, for instance.

Availability
In Ajmer (Rajasthan, India), there are many jhatka shops, with various bylaws requiring shops to display clearly that they sell jhatka meat.

By contrast there is no rule to affix board marking shops selling Halal meat.

In the past, there has been little availability of jhatka meat in the United Kingdom, so people have found themselves eating other types of meat, although jhatka has become more widely available.

See also

References

External links
 The Politics of Sikh Identity: Understanding Religious Exclusion, Paramjit S. Judge and Manjit Kaur (2010)
 The Myth of Goat Sacrifice and Hazoor Sahib
 Sikh Scholar Views on Diet

Ritual slaughter
Sikh practices